The C-53 Crash on the Gauli Glacier in the Bernese Alps, (Switzerland) on 19 November 1946 was a turning point in alpine rescue and an international media event. The aircraft, coming from Tulln, Austria (near Vienna), bound for Pisa, Italy, collided with the Gauli Glacier in poor visibility. On board were eight passengers (among them two high-ranking officers of the U.S. armed forces, four women, and one 11-year-old girl) and four crew. Several people were injured, but there were no fatalities.

The aircraft was found by a Lancaster bomber of 7th Squadron ( pathfinders) piloted by Flt Lt Geoffrey Douglas Head. The initial sighting was made by his rear gunner.  They were searching further north than the initial search area.  The Americans initially claimed they found the aircraft first but later made a statement to the press to credit the RAF for finding it first.

Flight 
On 18 November 1946 the C-53 Skytrooper military transport aircraft, (serial no. 42-68846) – a military, passenger-only, variant of the civilian Douglas DC-3 airliner – took off from Tulln Air Base near Vienna, Austria, bound for Pisa, Italy. The route planning was affected by bad weather, so they chose a route (950 km) via Munich, Strasbourg, Dijon and Marseille-Istres, to arrive in Pisa two days later.

The plane crashed into deep snow, which resulted in only one serious injury and rapidly depleted the speed of the aircraft.

Search 
The crew thought the aircraft had crashed in the French Alps. An hour after the crash, the crew was able to send emergency radio messages which were received at Orly Airport and at the Istres-Le Tubé Air Base near Marseille, tri-angulating their position in the Airolo-Sion-Jungfrau triangle. A large search and rescue operation began immediately.

At 0931 hours on 22 November an RAF Lancaster, piloted by F/L G. Head, spotted the aircraft through a break in the cloud cover. The crew managed to plot the location by using radio plots. Later that day when the clouds cleared, search aircraft were sent to this location.

A Boeing B-29 Superfortress sighted the aircraft by chance from an altitude of  whilst en route to Munich, later confirmed by the crew of a Swiss Air Force (SwAF) EKW C-36.

Rescue 

After the accident location was known, a large alpine rescue operation was begun. The United States Army (US Army) arrived on a train carrying equipment in Interlaken, where the normal gauge railway track ends. The U.S. response units were equipped with Willys MB jeeps and snowcats (some accounts describe the "snowcats" as being the amphibious-hulled versions of the American M29 Weasel tracked vehicles) but these were potentially useless in the alpine conditions (despite their intended design for wintertime use).  The potentially cumbersome use of military gliders was contemplated but was not considered further, so rescue teams had to proceed on foot.

At 10.20 AM, SwAF pilots Captain Victor Hug and Major Pista Hitz, managed to land two Fieseler Storch aircraft on the glacier beside the rescuers, and with eight flights, everyone was flown to safety. The Swiss army had tested snow landings and starts during the winter of 1944/45.

Aftermath 
After World War II, the diplomatic relationship between Switzerland and the United States was uncertain. But after the successful rescue, the political climate improved, in part because the rescue work was prominently covered by the international media.

The rescue operation would have repercussions a decade later when the Swiss were asked to support the rescue and salvage efforts after the 1956 Grand Canyon mid-air collision.

A more lasting impact of the incident was that the rescue of aircraft passengers in alpine terrain became seriously considered by authorities. The crash on the Gauli glacier is seen as the birth of Swiss air rescue, and in 1952, the Swiss Air Rescue Guard (Rega) was founded.

In 2012 & in 2018 remains of the machine that crashed in 1946 emerged on the Gauli Glacier, and subsequently the Swiss Army has been working to recover the wreck and clean up the site.

References

External links
 A summary on the accident and rescue, with some pictures.
 An image of the crashed C-47 can be found on this page
Glacier releases wreckage of the Dakota, Tages-Anzeiger 19 September 2015.

Aviation accidents and incidents in 1946
Aviation accidents and incidents in Switzerland
Accidents and incidents involving the Douglas C-47 Skytrain
Accidents and incidents involving United States Air Force aircraft
1946 in Switzerland